Yengejeh-ye Yaranmish (also Romanized as Yengejeh-ye Yārānmīsh; also known as Yengejeh-ye Bālā, Yengejeh-ye Yārāmesh, and Yengejeh-ye Yārānesh) is a village in Yekanat Rural District, Yamchi District, Marand County, East Azerbaijan Province, Iran. At the 2006 census, its population was 8, in 6 families.

References 

Populated places in Marand County